Mecklin is a surname. Notable people with the surname include:

John Mecklin (1918–1971), American journalist and diplomat
John Mecklin (journalist), American journalist, novelist, and editor

See also
Macklin (surname)